Britiande is a town in Portugal. It is a parish of Lamego Municipality. The population in 2011 was 934, in an area of 4.80 km2.

References

Freguesias of Lamego
Towns in Portugal